Humaira Ashiq (born: 1989) is a Pakistani judoka.

Career

National 
In national level competitions, Ashiq represents, WAPDA. At the National Games held in Peshawar in November 2019, Ashiq won gold in her weight category (-48kg).

International 
In 2009, Ashiq participated in the 1st Asian Martial Arts Games held in Bangkok, Thailand.

In 2010, at the 11th South Asian Games held in Dhaka, Bangladesh, Ashiq won a bronze medal in the -52kg event. At the Asian Judo Championships held in Guangzhou, China the same year, Ashiq competed in the -48kg event. She lost to Kazakhstan's Alexandra Podryadova by an ippon. 

In 2012, at the Asian Judo Championships held in Tashkent, Uzbekistan, Ashiq competed in the -52kg event. She lost to Kazakhstan's Kelbet Nurgazina by an ippon. At the South Asian Judo Championships held in Kathmandu, Nepal in 2014, Ashiq won a gold medal. At the 2015 Asian Judo Championships held in Kuwait City, Kuwait, Ashiq competed in the -48kg event. In the first round, she lost to Kazakhstan's Alexandra Podryadova by waza-ari.

At the 12th South Asian Games held in Guwahati, India in 2016, Ashiq wona silver in the -48kg category. At the Asian Indoor and Martial Arts Games held in Turkmenistan in 2017, Ashiq competed in belt wrestling winning  a bronze medal in the 50kg classic style. 2018 saw her win a silver medal at the 8th South Asian Judo Championship held in Nepal after losing to her Indian opponent in the final. 

At the World Championships held in Tokyo, Japan in 2019, Ashiq lost by an ippon to the world no 49, Mary Dee Vargas Ley of Chile in the first round.  In December she competed at the South Asian Games in Kathmandu, Nepal where she won a bronze medal in the -48kg event. Alongside her teammates: Hamid Ali, Shah Hussain Shah, Qaiser Khan, Karamat Butt, Mohammad Hasnain, Nadeem Akram, Beenish Khan, Amina Toyoda and Asma Rani she also won a silver medal in the mixed team event.

Competitions 
She has participated in the following international events:

 2009: First Asian Martial Arts Games, Bangkok, Thailand
April 2010: Asian Championships, Guangzhou, China
 2010: South Asian Games, Dhaka, Bangladesh
 April 2012: Asian Championships Seniors
 May 2015: Asian Championships Seniors
 2016: South Asian Games, Guwahati, India
 August 2019: World Championships Seniors, Tokyo, Japan
 2019: South Asian Games, Kathmandu, Nepal

External links
 Profile on IJF

References 

Living people
South Asian Games silver medalists for Pakistan
South Asian Games bronze medalists for Pakistan
South Asian Games medalists in judo
1989 births
Judoka at the 2010 Asian Games
Asian Games competitors for Pakistan
Pakistani judoka